Cerium(III) carbonate Ce2(CO3)3, is the salt formed by cerium(III) cations and carbonate anions. Its pure form was not yet confirmed to exist in the nature, but Ce-bearing carbonates (mainly bastnäsite group) stand for an ore of cerium metal, along with monazite.

Properties
The molecular weight of the compound of cerium(III) carbonate is 460.2587g/mole.

Different names
IUPAC name: Cerium tricarbonate.
Other chemical names: Dicerium tricarbonate, Cerium(III) carbonate, Cerium carbonate, Cerous Carbonate,  Dicerium(3+) ion tricarbonate.

Uses
Cerium(III) carbonate is used in the production of cerium(III) chloride, and in incandescent lamps.

References

Cerium(III) compounds
Carbonates